The  is a Bo-Bo wheel arrangement DC electric locomotive type operated by the private railway operator Chichibu Railway in Saitama Prefecture, Japan, primarily on freight services, since 1951.

, six (DeKi 102-105, 107-108) out of the original eight locomotives are in operation.

Sub-types
The class is divided into three sub-types: locomotive numbers DeKi 101, DeKi 102-106, and DeKi 107-108
 DeKi 101: Built 1951, total power output 640 kW
 DeKi 102-106: Built 1954-56, total power output 800 kW
 DeKi 107-108: Built 1951, purchased from Matsuo Mining Railway, total power output 800 kW

History
DeKi 101 was built by Hitachi in 1951. The locomotive was privately owned by Chichibu Cement (present-day Taiheiyo Cement), and was initially numbered DeKi 8. It was transferred to Chichibu Railway ownership in 1980.

Locomotives DeKi 102 and 103 were built in 1954 and locomotives DeKi 104 to 106 were built in 1956. These locomotives included uprated traction motors providing a total power output of 800 kW compared to the 640 kW of DeKi 101.

Originally numbered ED501 and ED502, these locomotives had similar external dimensions to DeKi 101, but used the same 200 kW traction motors as DeKi 102 to 106. They also feature icicle cutters above the driving cab windows. These two locomotives received the blue with white stripe livery that subsequently became the standard Chichibu Railway locomotive livery, replacing the previous brown livery.

From 1988, DeKi 101 was frequently used as an assisting locomotive at the back of steam-hauled SL Paleo Express services operating on the Chichibu Main Line. This locomotive was withdrawn in 2006, and was repainted into its original brown livery at Hirosegawara Depot, where it remains stored.

Locomotive DeKi 103 was repainted in red livery in 2011, but was returned to the standard blue and white stripe livery in October 2014 following overhaul.

Fleet details

Preserved examples
DeKi 101 is preserved at Hirosegawara Depot.

References

Chichibu Railway
Electric locomotives of Japan
Bo-Bo locomotives
Hitachi locomotives
1067 mm gauge locomotives of Japan
1500 V DC locomotives
Railway locomotives introduced in 1951